Mátételke (Croatian: Matević) is a  village in Bács-Kiskun county, in the Southern Great Plain region of southern Hungary. It is part of Bácsalmási kistérség.

Geography

Demographics
Existing ethnicities:
  Magyars 
  Bunjevci

External links 
Matetelke online

Populated places in Bács-Kiskun County